Branko Kokir (born 28 August 1974) is a Serbian former handball player.

Club career
Kokir made his professional debut with Partizan and spent seven seasons with the club (1993–2000). He later moved abroad and played for SG Willstätt/Schutterwald (2000–2004), Grasshoppers (2004–2005), HSV Hamburg (2005–2006) and TuS Nettelstedt-Lübbecke (2006–2009).

International career
Kokir represented Serbia and Montenegro (known as FR Yugoslavia until 2003) in international tournaments, winning two bronze medals at the World Championships (1999 and 2001). He also participated in two European Championships (1998 and 2004). Previously, Kokir won the gold medal at the 1998 World University Championship.

Honours
Partizan
 Handball Championship of FR Yugoslavia: 1993–94, 1994–95, 1998–99
 Handball Cup of FR Yugoslavia: 1993–94, 1997–98
HSV Hamburg
 DHB-Pokal: 2005–06

References

External links

 

1974 births
Living people
Sportspeople from Karlovac
Serbs of Croatia
Serbian male handball players
RK Partizan players
TuS Nettelstedt-Lübbecke players
Handball-Bundesliga players
Expatriate handball players
Serbian expatriate sportspeople in Germany
Serbian expatriate sportspeople in Switzerland